A gubernatorial election was held on 14 October 2004 to elect the next governor of , a prefecture of Japan in the Chūbu region of the main island of Honshu.

The incumbent, elected since 1992, Yukio Hirayama, 60, does not run again.

Candidates 
Hirohiko Izumida, 42, endorsed by LDP and NK.
Hidetoshi Taga, 54, backed by SDP and the local chapter of DPJ.
Ichizo Kobayashi, 68, former chief of the Urban Development Bureau of the Niigata prefecture, member of LDP.
Yukio Kawamata, 49, backed by the JCP.
Kaoru Miyakoshi, 63, bureaucrat in the Finance Ministry, former JRP militant.
Yuji Ito, 39.

Results

References 

2004 elections in Japan
Niigata gubernational elections